Oxygen is a 1999 film, directed and written by Richard Shepard. The film follows a troubled cop, Madeline Foster (played by Maura Tierney) as she pursues a kidnapper who calls himself Harry Houdini (Adrien Brody). The film was shot on location in New York City.

Plot
"Harry Houdini" (Adrien Brody) has kidnapped and buried alive a rich businessman's wife. He demands $1 million in cash from the woman's husband in return for the release of the location of her burial site before she runs out of oxygen. He also states that if police involvement is initiated, he will ensure she is never found alive. As expected, however, police involvement is initiated and Detective Madeline Foster (Maura Tierney) is assigned with the task of finding the buried woman and catching Houdini.

It is quickly realized though that Houdini, in fact, wanted the police to get involved so he could commit a second kidnapping - that of Foster. When Houdini is finally caught as the result of a car chase involving him and Detective Foster, she attempts to get him to reveal the location of his buried victim. When Foster's initial interrogation of Houdini proves unsuccessful, the FBI are assigned to take over the case, although they do not have any more luck. In a plot twist, it is revealed that Houdini has already committed a murder, that of his accomplice. He now has nothing to lose and the police realize the death of the buried woman would not be as significant as first thought.

However, Houdini offers them a final lifeline - if he is allowed to talk to Foster, alone, he will allow his victim to be recovered alive. The police, now just puppets in Houdini's plan, agree to his request. Troubled, Foster begins to reveal her darker side to Houdini and he sees a kindred spirit in her.

Soon after, it is revealed that Houdini was in fact a painter in the police department, and outlined the entire building in a very detailed map. Just as Foster is revealing the truth, Houdini takes her to the place where he buried the first woman. Foster escapes her hold, and releases the woman and takes Houdini's gun, then pushes him inside the coffin. As he taunts Foster, she shoots him rather than burying him.

Popular culture

Exhibits
The House of Houdini is a museum and performance venue located at 11, Dísz square in the Buda Castle in Budapest, Hungary.  In addition to housing the largest collection of original Houdini artifacts in Europe, it includes original props from the latest "HOUDINI" film  Oxygen (1999).

Other media
The deathcore bands Job for a Cowboy and Killwhitneydead have both released songs that feature a sound sample from this film where the woman is being buried. Job for a Cowboy included the sample in their track "Catharsis for the Buried" which appears as an intro for their Doom EP (2005). Killwhitneydead included the sample (among others from this film) on their song "I Already Have Enough Friends (Take Two)" (2004).

Reception
The film aggregator Rotten Tomatoes gave the film a score of 77%.

References

External links
 

1999 films
1999 crime thriller films
1990s psychological thriller films
Films shot in New York City
Films set in New York City
American crime thriller films
Films scored by Rolfe Kent
Films directed by Richard Shepard
1990s English-language films
1990s American films